Thomas Richard Tate is a Laotian-born Australian businessman, property investor and politician who is the current mayor of the City of Gold Coast. He was first elected on 28 April 2012 and re-elected on both 19 March 2016 and 28 March 2020 with more than two thirds of the preferential vote.

Personal life 
Tom Tate was born in 1959 in Vientiane, Laos, to a Thai mother and an Australian father. His father, Warwick, was an engineer who met Tate's mother, Prapai, when building an airport for the Americans in Thailand. At 11 months of age, Tate's mother took him to Thailand and falsely claimed it was a home birth in order to gain Thai-born citizenship. His parents separated when his father moved back to Sydney from Thailand in 1970, and Tate joined him a year later. Tate attended school at Scots College in Sydney where he was a drummer in the school's pipe band.

A qualified civil engineer, Tate graduated from the University of NSW in the early 1980s. He started his career in the construction industry, but transitioned into tourism and hospitality when he moved to the Gold Coast to manage his family's Queensland properties, including the Park Regis at Southport. Tate has been married to his wife, Ruth, for 39 years, and they have four children. His father died on 19 January 2015 after a long illness, and his funeral service was held at the Scots College Chapel in Sydney.

Tate is bilingual and speaks two languages fluently – English and Thai – with limited elementary proficiency in Laotian.

Business career 
Tate worked across the world before joining his father's development company in 1994 at the age of 35. In 1992, Tate Sr bought the Islander Resort Hotel in Surfers Paradise, where Tate managed the refitting of the building. In 1993, he took over management of the Islander. During the Asian economic downturn in the late 1990s, he offered hotel rooms for $2 per night, leading to the 1999 'off-peak price war'.

In 2015 he sold the Islander Hotel Resort for $26.5 million.

Political career 
Tate was elected mayor in 2012 as an independent, after the previous incumbent, Ron Clarke, resigned in February 2012, having announced his nomination as an independent candidate for the seat of Broadwater in the 2012 Queensland state election. Tate had two previous attempts at the mayoralty before his successful attempt, including as an endorsed Liberal candidate in 2008.

His re-election saw a significant increase in his primary vote, from 37% in 2012 to 63.86% in 2016.

On the 28th of March 2020, Tate won a 3rd term as mayor, receiving 55.73% of first preference votes and 66.93% after the distribution of preferences.

He is noted for his claim that he does not accept political donations and self-funds his campaigns.

Misconduct investigations

ABC investigation 
In September 2017, Tate was the main focus an ABC Four Corners investigation and resultant program titled All That Glitters. The report was compiled and presented by Walkley Award Winning ABC journalist Mark Willacy and investigated claims that Mayor Tom Tate had possibly acted inappropriately in his role as mayor.

The ABC report covered conflict of interest concerns, alleged council secrecy and the conduct of councillors and the mayor, questioning the integrity and legality of conduct within the council on specific major issues including development dealings and a proposed oceanside cruise ship terminal for the city.

A day after the program was broadcast on national television, Mayor Tom Tate banned ABC journalists from attending his press conferences in the local council chambers.

At the time, the Premier of Queensland, Annastacia Palaszczuk, said the program raised valid concerns about the integrity of local council, stating, "I think there were concerns about conflicts of interest, I think there are concerns about the nexus between developer donations and councillors voting ... we take those issues very seriously."

In December 2017, Tom Tate filed lawsuit against the ABC and his fellow Councillor Peter Young citing his own allegations that the program and the named parties had defamed him.

In July 2019 Tate was ordered to pay 90 percent of the ABC's legal costs for legal argument in preparation for his defamation claim against the national broadcaster after he sought to amend his statement of claim midway in the proceedings.

In December 2019, Tom Tate withdrew his lawsuit against fellow Councillor Peter Young.

In July 2021 a Deed of Settlement was reached between the ABC in which no findings were ruled against the ABC.

A representative of the ABC stated at the time, “Following a mediation process the legal action brought by Gold Coast Mayor Tom Tate over the ABC’s September 2017 Four Corners program All That Glitters has been discontinued. The program remains online with an Editor’s Note added. There has been no apology. No damages have been paid. The ABC has agreed to pay the mediation costs.”

An Editor's Note was published alongside the video and story reading, "In September 2017, the ABC broadcast this 4 Corners report, All that Glitters. Gold Coast Mayor Tom Tate commenced defamation proceedings against the ABC in relation to the report. He was concerned that viewers would understand it as accusing him of corruption. Mr Tate strongly denies any corrupt conduct, either on his part or that of the Council. The ABC wishes to make clear that the 4 Corners report did not contend that Mr Tate was corrupt or had acted unlawfully."

CCC Operation Yabber 
On 2 March 2018, Queensland's Crime and Corruption Commission (CCC), Queensland's state government authority for investigating official corruption in all tiers of government and public services, announced it would be investigating Mayor Tom Tate as part of a broader investigation into the City of Gold Coast titled Operation Yabber, investigating matters relating to decision-making by some sitting councillors.

In May 2018, The Crime and Corruption Commission announced it would be widening its investigation into Tate after further allegations of official misconduct were received.

In April 2019, Tate was cleared over corruption concerns relating to decision-making processes in council and concerns regarding conflicts of interest in the sale of council assets and allegations relating to the Waterglow development.

In January 2020 the CCC released its 84-page report into Operation Yabber which investigated the Gold Coast City Council as well as allegations of misconduct and corruption against Tom Tate and his former Chief of Staff, Wayne Moran.

The 84-page Yabber report detailed multiple instances in which Tom Tate allegedly breached official policy, used taxpayer money to purchase personal items, used council funds to make donations up to ten times the permissible amount under policy, misused powers to direct the council's Chief Executive Officer and failed to update his register of interests in the required timeframes.

The Operation Yabber report was described by the Australian Financial Review as a "scathing rebuke" of the actions of Mayor Tom Tate whilst in office.

The report concluded that Mayor Tate's Chief of Staff Wayne Moran's friends and associates were the beneficiaries of his position at the City of Gold Coast Council, and highlighted the alleged inappropriate use by Tate of section 170 of the Local Government Act 2009.

In its findings the CCC also reported that the Operation Yabber investigation had shown there is a risk that political staff/advisors may, whether at the urging of a mayor or councillor or of their own initiative, inappropriately interfere in council business.

Despite the report's findings against the council, against the Mayor's Chief of Staff and against Mayor Tate, the CCC did not find there was justification to warrant pursuing any criminal proceedings against Tom Tate or any Councillor or staff member, instead referring several matters to the Office of Independent Assessor (OIA) for further investigation.

Since the OIA was established by the Queensland State Government in December 2018, over 70 complaints have been lodged against Tate, with zero findings of guilt.

The final result of the Yabber investigations including the resulting OIA investigations saw multiple recommendations and reforms actioned, intended to improve the ethical and legal conduct of local council staff and officials after instances of misconduct, perceived conflicts and actual conflicts were exposed.

Response to CCC investigations 
Tom Tate has repeatedly maintained his innocence and that he has been the victim of an unnecessary campaign against him, alleging that the CCC overstepped its mandate in its investigations into himself and the City of Gold Coast council.

Tate has often been publicly vocal in his responses criticising the CCC and its chairperson, Alan MacSporran QC, calling on him to resign from his position as a result of his investigations into several South East Queensland councils, Tate and the City of Gold Coast council.

After significant pressure from the Local Government Association of Queensland and others, including Tate, the Queensland State Government announced a Parliamentary Inquiry into the CCC’s investigation of former councillors of Logan City Council. The Inquiry report was released on 2 December 2021 with significant negative findings regarding the CCC’s actions and recommendations for reform. Following the release of this report and after resisting calls to resign, MacSporran eventually resigned in January 2022.

Other misconduct 
In December 2018, Tom Tate was found guilty of official misconduct by the Local Government Remuneration and Discipline Tribunal and was ordered to undergo counselling as well as pay a $1250 fine after the tribunal found he had published "untrue and unreasonable comments" on his social media account criticising fellow city Councillor Glenn Tozer.

The matter concerned Tate bringing a policy to Council for review after he discovered that the Council’s CEO had approved funding of Councillor Tozer’s MBA through a local university. Tate made comments after the Council meeting, including that he did not believe ratepayer funding of a Councillor’s personal university studies passed the “pub test”.

After being found guilty, Tate said that with regard to protecting ratepayer funds he was “guilty as charged”. This led to a further allegation of inappropriate conduct being brought against Tate, but the decision maker ultimately found that there was insufficient evidence to make a finding of inappropriate conduct.

References

External links 
 City of Gold Coast profile of Tate. Retrieved 2015-11-10.

1959 births
Living people
Australian people of Thai descent
People from Vientiane
People educated at Scots College (Sydney)
University of New South Wales alumni
Australian civil engineers
Liberal Party of Australia politicians
Mayors of Gold Coast